The 2005 Istanbul DTM round was a motor racing event for the Deutsche Tourenwagen Masters held between 30 September – 2 October 2005. The event, part of the 19th season of the DTM, was held at the Istanbul Park in Turkey.

Results

Qualifying

Race

Championship standings after the race 
Bold text indicates 2005 champions.

 Note: Only the top five positions are included for three sets of standings.

References

External links 
Official website

|- style="text-align:center"
| width="35%"| Previous race:
| width="30%"| Deutsche Tourenwagen Masters2005 season
| width="40%"| Next race:

Istanbul DTM